Kurt Pahlen(May 26, 1907 – July 24, 2003) was an Austrian conductor and musicologist.

Life 
Pahlen was born in Vienna, in 1907. At the age of seven, he lost his father, the song accompanist Richard Pahlen. His mother got married for the second time to the banker Paul Raumann and moved to Berlin-Schmargendorf with him and his son. Kurt Pahlen studied musicology and German studies in his hometown. In addition, he completed an apprenticeship as Kapellmeister at the Vienna Music Academy. In 1929 he received his doctorate.

He was a conductor at Radio Wien and the Vienna Symphony and founded an opera studio at Ludo-Hartmann-Platz in the working-class district of Ottakring. Although, according to his own statement he was not personally threatened by Nazism, Pahlen did not return in 1938 from a stay in Zürich and emigrated in 1939 to Argentina. In Buenos Aires he became the music director and head of the Filarmónica Metropolitana, in which also played with the Austrian emigrant Estéban Eitler. Pahlen then became a professor at the Universidad de la República in Montevideo and was the founder and holder of the Department of Music History. For many years he was director of Teatro Colón in Buenos Aires; also taught at the Pestalozzi School Buenos Aires. In those years he befriended Manuel de Falla, Paul Hindemith, and also from Vienna, Erich Wolfgang Korngold.

After the end of the Third Reich, Pahlen conducted in the Vienna State Opera, the Zurich Opera, Theater Basel, Bern Theatre, Badisches Staatstheater Karlsruhe and other houses. He has performed with the NDR Symphony Orchestra, the Orchestre de la Suisse Romande, the Mozarteum Orchestra Salzburg and other orchestras. In the early 1970s, Pahlen returned to Switzerland and settled in Männedorf. He was professor at the Internationales Opernstudio of the Zürich Opera House. He taught masterclasses and was president of the Forum for Music and Movement in Lenk. He was visiting scholar at the University of Buenos Aires,  National University of La Plata, Federal University of  Rio de Janeiro, National Autonomous University of Mexico, Benemérita Universidad Autónoma de Puebla, University of Monterrey, Universidad Veracruzana and others.

During the  organized by him for children in Lenk, he died as a result of a fall.

Honors 

 1973: Austrian Cross of Honor for Science and Art First Class 
 1981: Grand Cross of Merit 
 1994: Honorary doctorate of the Universidad de Buenos Aires 
 2001: Grand Golden Medal of Merit for Services to the Republic of Austria 
 Golden Medal of Honor of the City of Vienna]
 Honorary Cup of the Province of Salzburg 
 Honorary Citizenship of Heroica Puebla de Zaragoza, Mexico

Publications 
Since 1944, Pahlen wrote over 40 books, some of which were translated into 16 languages. His radio and television programs as well as his introductory lectures at the Salzburg Easter Festival, Verona Opera Festival, Munich Opera Festival, Vienna Festival, and Bregenz Festival made him known to a large audience. Not only opera-goers, but also musicians, singers and conductors appreciate the guide he has published in the series "Operas of the World" on famous works of music theater.

 Musikgeschichte der Welt. Zürich 1947
 Manuel de Falla und die Musik in Spanien. Walter, Olten 1953
 Musiklexikon der Welt. Zürich 1956
 Tschaikovsky. Ein Lebensbild. Stuttgart 1959
 Musik. Eine Einführung. Zürich 1965
 Sinfonie der Welt. 1967
 Mensch und Musik. 1974
 Oratorien der Welt. 1985
 Die großen Epochen der abendländischen Musik. 1991
 Das Buch der Volkslieder. 176 Volkslieder aus acht Jahrhunderten. 1998
 Die große Geschichte der Musik. 2002 (revised edition of Die großen Epochen...)
 Reihe Opern der Welt – die großen Werke der Opernliteratur (a volume to a well-known work of music theater with textbook, introduction and commentary)
 Ja, die Zeit ändert viel. Mein Jahrhundert mit der Musik (Autobiography). München 2001,

Bibliography 

 Ingrid Bigler-Marschall:Andreas Kotte
 An die Freude: das Leben von Gluck, Haydn, Mozart, Beethoven, Schubert, told by Kurt Pahlen. In collaboration with Rosemarie König, Diogenes, Zürich 2005, .

References

External links 
 
 

 
 Obituaries for Kurt Pahlen from the Wiener und Berliner Zeitung

Male conductors (music)
1907 births
2003 deaths
Commanders Crosses of the Order of Merit of the Federal Republic of Germany
Recipients of the Austrian Cross of Honour for Science and Art, 1st class
Musicians from Vienna
20th-century Austrian musicologists
20th-century Austrian conductors (music)
20th-century Austrian male musicians